WRWS-LP (99.1 FM) is the campus radio station of Bethune-Cookman University in Daytona Beach, Florida.  The station broadcasts in the Daytona Beach area as an LPFM. The station is non-profit, entirely student-run, and broadcasts an urban format.

References

External links
 

RWS-LP
RWS-LP
RWS-LP
Bethune–Cookman University
Radio stations established in 2008
Urban contemporary radio stations in the United States
2008 establishments in Florida